Essam El-Gindy (also known as Essam El-Gendy and Esam Mohamed Ahmed Nagib; born 14 July 1966) is an Egyptian chess Grandmaster and FIDE Trainer.

He is a former Egyptian Champion (2002), African Champion (2003) and has represented Egypt in three Chess Olympiads (1996, 1998, 2014). He has competed at two FIDE World Chess Championships (1999, 2004) and seven Chess World Cups (2007, 2009, 2011, 2013, 2017, 2019, 2021).

Career

In 2003, El-Gindy won the delayed 2002 Egyptian Chess Championship, shared first (third on tiebreak) with 8/10 at the Golden Cleopatra Open, followed by scoring his first two GM norms at the African Championships with 7.5/9 and the Arab Chess Championships with 7/9 in 2003. Eventually he reached his final norm in 2008 with 9/12 at the Alushta Summer Open.

He made his debut at World Championship level with a first round 2–0 exit to Ulf Andersson in the FIDE World Chess Championship 1999.

El-Gindy's success at the African Chess Championship of 2003 earned him a spot in the FIDE World Chess Championship 2004, losing in the first round to Aleksej Aleksandrov 1½–½. He qualified for the Chess World Cup six times via the African Championships. His third place on tiebreak in 2007 secured a place at the Chess World Cup 2007 where he scored an upset win in the first round against former FIDE World Champion and eventual quarter-finalist Ruslan Ponomariov, but he went on to lose the match after rapid tiebreaks 2½–1½. A fourth-place finish in 2009 saw him qualify for the Chess World Cup 2009, going out in the first round to Ponomariov 1½–½.
Second place in 2011 saw him qualify for the Chess World Cup 2011, going out in the first round to Zoltán Almási 2–0.
Third place on tiebreak in 2013 saw him qualify for the Chess World Cup 2013, where he went out in first round 2–0 to Leinier Domínguez.

In 2009, El-Gindy won the Arab Chess Championship, scoring 7/9.

El-Gindy won the 2014 AIDEF Chess Championships on tiebreak with a score of 7.5/9.

Team results

El-Gindy has competed in various team tournaments at both club and international level. He has won three team golds and an individual gold and bronze at international level, representing Egypt. For his clubs, El-Gindy has won four team golds and a team silver medal as well as gold, two silvers and two bronze medals for his individual play.

International results

Club results

Note

References

External links
Essam El Gindy chess-games at 365Chess.com

1966 births
Living people
Chess grandmasters
Egyptian chess players
Chess Olympiad competitors
Chess coaches
Sportspeople from Cairo
African Games bronze medalists for Egypt
African Games medalists in chess
Competitors at the 2003 All-Africa Games
Competitors at the 2007 All-Africa Games
Competitors at the 2011 All-Africa Games
21st-century Egyptian people